Greeks in Austria number between 5,000 and 18,000 people. They are located all around the country, but the main community is located in Vienna.

History 

Contacts between the Greeks and the Austrians can be led back in the aristocracy of the Middle Ages. All the Babenberg dukes from Leopold V onward were descended from Byzantine emperors.

The Greek Johannes Theodat opened on 17 January 1685 Vienna's first coffee house in Haarmarkt. As a reward for his services, he was granted the privilege of being the only trader in the city to sell coffee as a drink for 20 years. Furthermore, by 1700, four Greek merchants had the privilege to serve coffee in public.

In the 18th century, Vienna was the centre of Greek diaspora where persons like Rigas Feraios, Anthimos Gazis, Neophytos Doukas and the Ypsilantis family prepared the Greek War of Independence. There were also various institutions founded in Vienna that promote the Greek language and learning, contributing to the Modern Greek Enlightenment. In 1814, the Count Ioannis Kapodistrias, at that time Foreign Minister of the Russian Empire, in collaboration with Anthimos Gazis, founded in Vienna the Philomuse Society, an educational organization promoting philhellenism, such as studies for the Greeks in Europe.

Additionally, ethnic Aromanians coming mostly from Moscopole, and generally from the Balkans, who self-identified as Greeks, have also been considered as part of the Greek diaspora.

Furthermore, of great economic importance and social acknowledgment attained the Greeks in Austria in the 19th century. The first Greek newspaper was printed there and the Hellenic National School in Vienna is today the oldest such in the world that has remained continuously in operation. 
In 1856, after a request by Simon Sinas, Johann Strauss II composed the Hellenen-Polka (Hellenes Polka) op. 203 for an annual ball of the Greek community in the Austro-Hungarian empire.

In 20th century, Austria (and especially Graz and Linz) was a popular destination for Greek students.

Architectural heritage
The Austrian magnate of Greek origin Georgios Sinas (father of Simon Sinas) invited the Danish architect Theophil Hansen who worked in Athens (and had designed there major public buildings like the Zappeion and the Academy of Athens) to design for him some new buildings for his companies in Austria. Other Greek Austrians like Nikolaus Dumba and Ignaz von Ephrussi also gave Hansen contracts for buildings in the Classical Greek style and the Gräzisierter-Neorennaissance-Stil. After Works like the Palais Ephrussi and the Palais Dumba Hansen was famous and build many other public buildings in Austria like the Parliament of Austria and the Musikverein.

In the former Greek Quarter of Vienna at the  there are the two historical Greek Orthodox parishes (St George and Holy Trinity). A traditional Austrian Restaurant there is called  ("Greek Tavern", because of its Greek visitors since the 18th century) and a street  ("Greek Lane").

Notable Greeks in Austria 
 Coudenhove-Kalergi family, noble family of mixed Flemish and Cretan Greek descent.
 Nikolaus Dumba (c. 1830–1900), industrialist, liberal politician, benefactor of Greece and patron of the arts. Sponsored the construction of Musikverein.
 Konstantin Dumba (c. 1856–1947), diplomat serving as its last accredited Ambassador to the United States.
 Simon Sinas (c. 1810–1876), banker and diplomat, benefactor of Greece.
 Constantin von Economo (c. 1876–1931), psychiatrist and neurologist.
 Ephrussi family, banking family of Romaniotes descent.
 Demeter Laccataris (c. 1798-1864), painter based in Pest.
 Logothetti family, noble family originally from Zante.
 Hugo II Logothetti (c. 1852–1918), diplomat and last emissary of the Habsburg monarchy in Tehran.
 Baltazzi family, aristocratic banking family, baroness Mary Vetsera's maternal family
 Theodor Baltazzi (c. 1788-1860), prominent banker born in Istanbul.
 Aristides Baltazzi c. 1843-1914), was a horse breeder, member of the Austrian Imperial Council and large landowner. 
 Pappas Family, founders of the Alpine construction group and importers of Mercedes-Benz in Austria and Hungary
 Anastasios Pappas, Merchant in Vienna, 1821 revolutionary, member of Filiki Eteria and son of Emmanouel Pappas the Leader of the Greek War of Independence in Macedonia
 Karajan family, merchant family based in  Chemnitz then Electorate of Saxony
 Herbert von Karajan (c. 1908-1989),  principal conductor of the Berlin Philharmonic.
 Georg Zachariades (c. 1848-1943) industrialist, figure skater and racing cyclist.
 Georg von Metaxa (c. 1914–1944), tennis player, his father was descended from the aristocratic Metaxas family from Cephallonia.
 Christian Michelides (b. 1957), psychotherapist and director of Lighthouse Wien.
 Konstantin Filippou, chef and restaurateur 
 Maria Vassilakou (b. 1969), Vice-Mayor of Vienna, President of the Viennese branch of The Greens – The Green Alternative, the fourth party in the Austrian Parliament
 Karolos Trikolidis. conductor
 Peter Persidis, football player

See also 
Austria–Greece relations

References 

Austria
Ethnic groups in Austria
Austria–Greece relations